Ahn Jae-hyung (Hangul: 안재형, Hanja: 安宰亨; born January 8, 1965) is a male former table tennis player from South Korea who competed in the 1988 Summer Olympics. 

Since 2017 he has been the head coach of South Korea's women's national team.

He married Chinese table tennis player Jiao Zhimin in 1989. The couple's son, golfer An Byeong-hun, became the youngest champion in United States Amateur Championship history, winning the 2009 event at the age of 17.

See also
 List of table tennis players

References

External links

1965 births
Living people
South Korean male table tennis players
Table tennis players at the 1988 Summer Olympics
Olympic table tennis players of South Korea
Olympic bronze medalists for South Korea
Olympic medalists in table tennis
Medalists at the 1988 Summer Olympics
Asian Games medalists in table tennis
Table tennis players at the 1986 Asian Games
Medalists at the 1986 Asian Games
Asian Games gold medalists for South Korea
Asian Games bronze medalists for South Korea
South Korean table tennis coaches
20th-century South Korean people